The Assistant Chief of the Naval Staff (Weapons) was a senior British Royal Navy appointment. The post holder was part of the Admiralty Naval Staff and member of the Board of Admiralty from 1941 to 1946.

History
Originally created in September 1941 as a new position due to the re-evaluating of the responsibilities of the Assistant Chief of Naval Staff the post holder was a part of the Admiralty Naval Staff and member of the Board of Admiralty. The post holder was responsible for supervising the directors of a number of naval staff divisions specifically the Gunnery Division and Torpedo Division's until April 1946 when the post was abolished.

Office Holders
Included:
 Rear-Admiral Rear-Admiral Rhoderick R. McGrigor, — (September 1941–March 1943) 
 Rear-Admiral Rear-Admiral Wilfrid R. Patterson, — (March 1943-February 1945)
 Rear-Admiral Robert Don Oliver, — (February 1945–April 1946)

References

A